List of all the songs by British-Irish boy band The Wanted.

Wanted
Wanted